Jamestown Township is one of twelve townships in Steuben County, Indiana, United States. As of the 2010 census, its population was 3,249 and it contained 2,937 housing units.

History
Pokagon State Park, Collins School, and CCC Shelter are listed on the National Register of Historic Places.

Geography
Lakes in this township include Barton Lake, Big Otter Lake, Failing Lake, Green Lake, Hog Lake, Jimmerson Lake, Lake Charles West, Lake Lonidaw, Lake Minfenokee, Little Otter Lake, Lone Hickory Lake, Long Beach Lake, Marsh Lake, Middle Basin of Lake James, Seven Sisters Lakes, Snow Lake and the Upper Basin of Lake James. The stream of Follette Creek runs through this township.

Unincorporated towns
 Jamestown at 
 Lake James at 
 Nevada Mills at 
 Potawatomi Inn (a hotel in Pokagon State Park)
 Valley Outlet Center (a shopping center)
(This list is based on USGS data and may include former settlements.)

Cemeteries
The township contains one cemetery, Jamestown.

Major highways
  Interstate 69
  Interstate 80
  Interstate 90
  State Road 120
  State Road 127

Education
Jamestown Township residents may obtain a free library card from the Fremont Public Library.

References
 
 United States Census Bureau cartographic boundary files

External links
 Indiana Township Association
 United Township Association of Indiana

Townships in Steuben County, Indiana
Townships in Indiana